Lucas is a surname. Notable people with the surname include:

Abraham Lucas (born 1998), American football player
Alfred Lucas (disambiguation), one of several people including:
Alfred Lucas (chemist) (1867–1945), English analytical chemist, known for his part in the excavation of Tutankhamun's tomb
Alfred Lucas (Indian Army officer) (1822–1896), English staff officer in the British Indian Army
A. P. Lucas (1857–1923), English cricketer
Allen T. Lucas (1917–1973), American lawyer and politician
Anthony Francis Lucas (1855–1921), Croatian-born oil-field engineer
Antoinette Lucas (born 1968), American field hockey player
Arthur Lucas (1907-1962), American criminal, one of the last two people to be executed in Canada
Arthur Lucas (academic) (born 1941), Australian academic who served as the 18th Principal of King's College London
Arthur Henry Shakespeare Lucas (1853–1936), English-born Australian schoolmaster and scientist
Baron Lucas, aristocratic family name - see below
Benjamin Lucas, Anglo-Irish soldier of the 17th century
Buddy Lucas (musician) (1914-1983), American jazz saxophonist and bandleader
Buddy Lucas (swimmer) (1931-2002), New Zealand swimmer
Caroline Lucas (born 1960), English politician
Caroline Byng Lucas (1886–1967), English artist
Charles Lucas (1613–1648), English soldier
Charles Lucas (architect) (1838–1905), French architect
Charles Lucas (musician) (1808–1869), English cellist
Charles Lucas (politician) (1713–1771), Irish politician and physician
Charles Davis Lucas (1834–1914), Anglo-Irish soldier, Victoria Cross recipient
Charlotte Lucas (born 1976), English actress
Chase Lucas (born 1997), American football player
Clarence Lucas (1866–1947), Canadian composer
Colin Lucas (born 1940), British historian
Colin Lucas (born 1969), Scottish footballer
Colin Lucas(born 1969, Elderslie Scotland), Scottish Footballer
Craig Lucas (born 1951), American playwright
David Lucas (born 1937), American music producer and jingle writer
David Lucas, pseudonym of Steven Blum (born 1965), American voice actor
Dick Lucas (minister) (born 1925), British evangelical speaker
Dick Lucas (singer), British vocalist
E. V. Lucas (1868–1938), British writer
Édouard Lucas (1842–1891), French mathematician who studied Lucas numbers and the closely related Fibonacci numbers (both of which are examples of a Lucas sequence)
Edward Lucas, one of several people including:
Edward Lucas (journalist), British journalist
Eliza Lucas (c.1722–1793), Antiguan-born plantation manager
Francis Lucas, one of several people including:
Francis Lucas (English politician) (1850–1918), British company director and Conservative Member of Parliament for Lowestoft 1900–1906
Frank E. Lucas (1876–1948), American politician
Frank Lucas (1894–1967), English literary critic
Frank Lucas (drug lord) ( 1930–2019), American drug dealer
Frank Lucas (Oklahoma politician) (born 1960), American politician
Frederick Lucas (1812–1855), British journalist
Frederick Ross Lucas (Buddy Lucas, 1931–2002), New Zealand swimmer
Fred Lucas (Frederick Warrington Lucas, 1903–1987), American Major League Baseball player
Sir Frederick Cook, 2nd Baronet (Frederick Lucas Cook, 1844–1920), British politician
Frederic Augustus Lucas (1852–1929), American anatomist and museum director
Gary Lucas, American musician
Gary Lucas (baseball) (born 1954), American baseball player
Geoffry Lucas (1872–1947), English architect (often mis-spelt Geoffrey)
George Lucas (born 1944), American filmmaker
George W. Lucas (1845–1921), American soldier, Medal of Honor recipient
Helen Lucas (born 1931), Canadian artist
Henry Lucas (politician) (c.1610–1663), British politician and benefactor
Henry Lee Lucas (1936–2001), American serial killer
Hippolyte Lucas (1814–1899), French entomologist
Hippolyte-Julien-Joseph Lucas (1807–1878), French writer and critic
Ian Lucas (born 1960), British politician
Isaac Benson Lucas (1867–1940), Canadian politician
Isabel Lucas (born 1985), Australian actress
Isabelle Lucas (1927–1997), British actress and singer
James Lucas, multiple people
Jean Jacques Étienne Lucas (1764–1819), French naval officer
Jean Lucas (1917–2003), French racing driver
Jeanne Hopkins Lucas (c. 1936–2007), American politician
Jerry Lucas (born 1940), American basketball player
Jett Lucas (born 1993), American actor, son of George Lucas
Jim G. Lucas (1914–1970), American journalist
John Lucas, one of several people including:
John Lucas (comics), American comic book artist
John Lucas (philosopher) (1929–2020), British philosopher
Sir John Lucas, 1st Baron Lucas of Shenfield (1606–1671), brother of Charles Lucas
John Lucas (VC) (1827–1892), Irish soldier, recipient of the Victoria Cross after action in New Zealand
John Lucas II (born 1953), American basketball player, NBA
John Lucas III (born 1982), American basketball player, son of John Lucas II
John Meredyth Lucas (1919–2002), American screenwriter and director
John P. Lucas (1890–1949), American general in World War II
John Seymour Lucas (1849–1923), British artist
Joseph Lucas (1834–1902), founder of the British automotive electrical components manufacturer Lucas Automotive, LucasVarity
Josh Lucas (born 1971), American actor
Joyner Lucas (born 1988), American rapper
Kalin Lucas (born 1989), American basketball player in the Israel Basketball Premier League
Ken Lucas (disambiguation)
Louise Lucas (born 1944), Virginia politician
Malcolm Lucas (1927–2016), American judge
Margaret Bright Lucas (1818-1890), British temperance activist and suffragist
Marquis Lucas (born 1993), American football player
Martha Lucas Pate (1912–1913), American college administrator
Matt Lucas (born 1974), British comedian
Maurice Lucas (1952–2010), American basketball player
Michael Lucas, one of several people including:
Michael Lucas (director) (born 1972), Russian-Israeli-American pornographic film actor, director, and LGBT activist
Michael Lucas (political activist) (1926–2020), Canadian artist, designer, and political activist
Michael William George Lucas (1926–2001), British politician, 2nd Lord Lucas of Chilworth
Nathaniel Lucas (1764–1818), English convict transported to Australia
Netley Lucas (–1940), English confidence trickster
Nick Lucas (1897–1982), American jazz guitarist and singer
Ove Lucas (born ca. 1960), Dutch curator and director
Peter Lucas (disambiguation), one of several people including:
Peter Lucas (footballer) (1929–2019), Australian rules footballer
Peter J. Lucas (born 1962), Polish and American actor
Ray Lucas (born 1972), American football player
Ray Lucas (baseball) (1908–1969), American baseball pitcher and manager
Raymond B. Lucas (born 1890), Justice of the Supreme Court of Missouri
Reggie Lucas (1953–2018), American guitarist, songwriter, and producer
Richard Lucas, one of several people including:
Richard Lucas (priest) (c. 1640–1715), Welsh clergyman
Richard Lucas (politician) (1837–1916), Tasmanian politician
Richard Lucas (rower) (1886–1968), British rower
Richie Lucas (born 1938), American footballer
Richard Cockle Lucas (1800–1883), English sculptor
Robert Lucas, one of several people including:
Robert Lucas (governor) (1781–1853), American politician
Robert Lucas Jr. (born 1937), American economist (Lucas critique)
Sam Lucas (1848–1916), American actor and minstrel performer
Samuel Lucas (1811–1865), British abolitionist and newspaper editor
Samuel Lucas (1805–1870), 'Senior" - British brewer and painter
Sarah Lucas (born 1962), British artist
Scott Lucas, one of several people including:
Scott W. Lucas (1892–1968), U.S. Senator and Senate Majority Leader from Illinois
Scott Lucas (footballer) (born 1977), Australian footballer
Scott Lucas (musician), founding member of Local H
Shannon Lucas, American extreme metal drummer
Spencer G. Lucas, American paleontologist
 St. John Lucas (1879–1934), English poet and anthologist
Steve Lucas, commander of Canadian Forces Air Command
Thomas Lucas (Royalist) (d. 1649), English Cavalier, brother of and John and Charles
Thomas Lucas (c. 1720–1784), English MP and West Indies merchant
Thomas Geoffry Lucas (1872–1947), English architect
Thomas Pennington Lucas (1843–1917), Scottish-born Australian medical practitioner
Tommy Lucas (1895–1953), English footballer
Trevor Lucas, Australian folk-rock musician
Victor Lucas (television producer), Canadian writer and TV show director
Vinka Lucas, New Zealand fashion and bridalwear designer
Vrain Denis-Lucas, French forger
Werner Lucas, German pilot
Wilfred Lucas, Canadian film actor and director
William John Lucas, English teacher and entomologist

Lucas as an aristocratic family name, Baron Lucas of Crudwell, may refer to:
Mary Grey, Countess of Kent, 1st Baroness Lucas of Crudwell (died 1702)
Henry Grey, 1st Duke of Kent, 2nd Baron Lucas of Crudwell (1671–1740)
Anthony Grey, Earl of Harold, 3rd Baron Lucas of Crudwell (1695–1723)
Jemima Yorke, 2nd Marchioness Grey, 4th Baroness Lucas of Crudwell (1722–1797)
Thomas de Grey, 2nd Earl de Grey, 6th Baron Lucas of Crudwell (1781–1859)
Anne Florence Cowper, 7th Baroness Lucas of Crudwell (1806–1880)
Francis Cowper, 7th Earl Cowper, 8th Baron Lucas of Crudwell (1834–1905)
Auberon Herbert, 9th Baron Lucas of Crudwell (1876–1916)
Nan Ino Cooper, 10th Baron Lucas of Crudwell (1880–1958)
Anne Rosemary Palmer, 11th baroness of Crudwell (1919–1991)
Ralph Palmer, 12th Baron Lucas of Crudwell (born 1951)

See also
Luca (surname)
Lucas (disambiguation)
Lukas
Luke (name)
Lukis

Hungarian-language surnames